Humberto Jorge Simões Dias Ramos Gomes (born 1 January 1978) is a Portuguese handball player for Póvoa AC and the Portuguese national team.

He represented Portugal at the 2020 European Men's Handball Championship. He had the best saves-to-shots ratio of any goalkeeper with at least 20% of total shots received by their team in 2021 World Men's Handball Championship where he stops 43% of shots.

Career Statistics

References

External links

1978 births
Living people
Portuguese male handball players
Sportspeople from Braga
Sporting CP handball players
Handball players at the 2020 Summer Olympics